Nazret Weldu Gebrehiwet (born 1 January 1990) is a female long-distance runner from Eritrea. She competed in the 10,000 metres at the 2015 World Championships in Beijing finishing 24th. In 2019, she competed in the senior women's race at the 2019 IAAF World Cross Country Championships held in Aarhus, Denmark. She finished in 27th place.

She competed in the women's marathon at the 2020 Summer Olympics.

International competitions

Personal bests
Outdoor
400 metres – 54.99 (Khartoum 2007, NR)
800 metres – 2:04.26 (Bilbao 2008)
1500 metres – 4:09.34 (Mataró 2012)
3000 metres – 9:11.32 (Doha 2012)
5000 metres – 15:33.28 (Carquefou 2017)
10,000 metres – 32:58.28 (Hengelo 2016)
Half marathon – 1:09:47 (New Delhi 2020)
Marathon – 2:20:29 (Eugene 2022, NR)

References

Living people
Place of birth missing (living people)
1990 births
Eritrean female middle-distance runners
Eritrean female long-distance runners
World Athletics Championships athletes for Eritrea
Athletes (track and field) at the 2020 Summer Olympics
Olympic athletes of Eritrea